Harry Arthur Yeomans (11 April 1901 – 25 February 1965) was an English footballer who played as goalkeeper for Southampton in the mid-1920s.

Football career
Yeomans was born in Farnborough and played as an amateur for Camberley & Yorktown, also representing the Hampshire F.A., before joining Southampton in December 1922. At , Yeomans was the tallest goalkeeper to have played for the "Saints" (along with George Ephgrave). Known as "Tiny", Yeomans was signed as understudy to Tommy Allen and consequently never enjoyed a lengthy run in the first team, making four appearances in April 1925 and eight in the following September/October.

In 1926, Yeomans decided to abandon his footballing career and joined the local Police force, for whom he played in the local football leagues.

References

1901 births
People from Farnborough, Hampshire
1965 deaths
English footballers
Association football goalkeepers
Camberley Town F.C. players
Southampton F.C. players
English Football League players